Brent Hutton (born 15 April 1964) is a former Australian rules footballer who played with the West Coast Eagles in the Victorian Football League (VFL) and Swan Districts in the West Australian Football League (WAFL).

A local from Bassendean, Hutton had his breakthrough season for Swan Districts in 1984 when he was used as a full-forward and kicked 83 goals to win the league's goal-kicking award. He kicked five goals in that year's grand final win over East Fremantle.

Hutton spent much of the 1985 season as a defender due to a loss of form but by 1987 was club captain. Also, in 1987, he kicked three goals for Western Australiain an interstate match against South Australia at the WACA.

Hutton was signed by West Coast in 1988 but was in and out of the side during his two-season stint, with 13 appearances. He continued playing at Swan Districts and was a member of another premiership side in 1990.

References

External links
Brent Hutton player profile page at WAFL FootyFacts

1964 births
West Coast Eagles players
Swan Districts Football Club players
Living people
Australian rules footballers from Western Australia